The 53rd Assembly District of Wisconsin is one of 99 districts in the Wisconsin State Assembly. Located in east-central Wisconsin, the district comprises most of the southern half of Winnebago County and parts of central Fond du Lac County, and includes city of Waupun, which extends into Dodge County.  The district also contains the city of Omro and part of the city of Oshkosh, as well as the villages of North Fond du Lac, Rosendale, and Winneconne. The seat has been held by Republican Michael Schraa since January 2013.

The 53rd Assembly district is located within Wisconsin's 18th Senate district, along with the 52nd and 54th Assembly districts.

List of past representatives

References 

Wisconsin State Assembly districts
Dodge County, Wisconsin
Fond du Lac County, Wisconsin
Winnebago County, Wisconsin